Best Weretamarapere Atti, popularly known as Bestie Tamara Atti (née Andafa) is a Nigerian lawyer, technology entrepreneur, business development professional, women development consultant and founder of Bestie Network Africa, a social enterprise that promotes education, entrepreneurship, innovation and leadership for young African women. She is also the co-founder and CEO of Corporate Bestie, a technology company that provides an all-in-one incorporation and regulatory compliance tool for entrepreneurs and enterprises to start, launch and manage their businesses without stress or complex paper work so that they can grow, get access to funding, build customer loyalty, develop investor trust, create new jobs and contribute to economic development.

Early life and education 
Bestie was born on April 9, 1991, in the city of Warri, Delta State, Nigeria and originates from Bayelsa State. She completed her secondary education at Federal Government College Warri (FGCW) and graduated from the University of Benin, Nigeria in 2013 where she studied Law as a first degree. She was called to the Nigerian Bar in 2014 after graduating from the Nigerian Law School in Abuja.

Personal life 
She is married to Squadron Leader Akpoebi Samuelson Atti (rtd) and have a daughter.

Career 
After her call to the Nigerian Bar Association, Best Atti was deployed to Abia State, Nigeria under the one year mandatory National Youth Service Corps (NYSC) program, where she served in a World Bank assisted project - Nigeria Erosion and Watershed Management as a Legal/Operations Officer. She also participated in several community development projects that impacted children, women and youths in Abia State. She was recognized and given a State Honours Award as an Outstanding Corps Member for her contributions to the socio-economic development of the state. 

Her entrepreneurial journey kicked off while serving as an organizer at Techstars Startup Weekend Aba in 2016 which she has continued to do since then, serving in other capacities such as judge, mentor and facilitator. 

Passionate about the growth of technology and entrepreneurship, in 2017, she founded Corporate Bestie to support entrepreneurs to start, launch and grow successful businesses, after her first business failed. In 2018 she co-founded Innovation Growth Hub (IGHub) a creative, business, and technology incubation Hub with office locations in Aba, Onitsha, Lagos, and Asaba. IGHub carries out its activities by working with startup entrepreneurs, innovators, and SMEs at various stages of maturity by providing space, mentorship, steady internet supply, power, training, business support services, and a warm community and network in order to drive innovation, technology adoption, skills development, and economic advancement. So far, Innovation Growth Hub has impacted and supported over 30,000 individuals and MSMEs to start and scale their businesses.

In 2017, she founded Bestie Network Africa, a women's development community where she mentors and trains over 4,000 young African women between the ages of 17 – 35, providing them with access to opportunities, resources and programs to help them live their very best life, build businesses and empower their communities. One of such programs is the Value Circle Mentorship Program that helps women identify and maximize their skills and passion to build profitable businesses and lead change in their communities. The flagship event of this community is Fempower Africa which is held annually in celebration of International Women's Day. FemPower Africa, is an annual learning and networking event for professional and entrepreneurial women which has held 3 times as a physical event from 2017 - 2019 in south-east Nigeria with over 500 young women in attendance and a virtual event in 2020 with over 4,500 registered participants

Atti has worked in partnerships with several international and local organizations in the private and public sectors including Google, Facebook now Meta, She Leads Africa, Ventures Platform, Abia State Government, Tony Elumelu Foundation, to promote entrepreneurship, innovation, technology adoption, digital skills development, women and youth development, corporate governance and regulatory compliance.

In the light of the COVID-19 pandemic in 2020, Bestie Atti launched a digital skills training program tagged "Digital Ninja Bootcamp" and trained 10 young African entrepreneurs with high-income digital skills and products to help them stay relevant and profitable in the new global digital economy.

Awards 
In 2010, Best was awarded a National Merit Award Scholarship by Total E & P Limited Nigeria (TotalEnergies) in support of her education at the University of Benin, Nigeria

In 2015, she received a State Honours Award for her contributions to the socio-economic development of Abia State by the National Youth Service Corps

In 2018, her company, CorporateBestie was recognized as one of the top 100 Emerging SMEs in Nigeria by Connect Nigeria, The British Council and Union Bank

In 2020, she received the Ladies of Honour Award in the category of Digital/Media Entrepreneur

In 2020, she received an Honorary Award from Skills Factory Africa for her contributions in the development and transformational journey of African Youths at the Skill Acceleration Bootcamp

In 2020, she also received the Hall of Fame Dignity Awards at the International Young Women Conference by Dignify Womanhood Platform for her immerse contribution to societal development and commitment to women and girls' empowerment in Africa.

Books 
Bestie Atti is a 4-time Amazon published Author with books such as: The Digital Ninja Toolbox: 101+ Tools & Resources for every digitally mobile African  and The Value Capital Calculator: The Ultimate Guide to help you identify and maximize your value for global income, impact and influence. ,The Design Your Best Life Yearly Planner and the Design Daily Journal

References 

Nigerian women in business
Living people
Year of birth missing (living people)
University of Benin (Nigeria) alumni